Jørgen Liebenberg Bentzon (14 February 1897 – 9 July 1951) was a Danish composer, cousin of Danish composer Niels Viggo Bentzon and flautist Johan Bentzon. He was a student of Carl Nielsen from 1915 until 1919.

His works include six works entitled Racconto, the first for flute, alto saxophone, bassoon and double bass, the second for flute and string trio, the third of which is for woodwind trio, etc.; a Sinfonia Buffo Op. 35 and two symphonies (the first, Op. 37, inspired by Charles Dickens); a piano concerto (recorded on private tape); "Three expressive sketches" for violin and cello; a string quartet; an opera Saturnalia; and other works.

Selected works
 Variations on a Theme of Chopin, Op. 1, for piano
Fabula, Op. 42, for viola solo (1939)

See also

References

Biography
DaCapo page on Jørgen Bentzon

1897 births
1951 deaths
Danish classical composers
Danish male classical composers
20th-century classical composers
Pupils of Carl Nielsen
20th-century male musicians
Burials at Mariebjerg Cemetery